The Australian city of Darwin was home to a Chinatown when "... 186 Chinese workers arrived in 1874 by ship from Singapore, until World War II."  In Darwin, the Chinese faced racial discrimination much more compared to the rest of Australia.  Darwin's Chinatown was described as "... an unsightly slum, where cramped unhygenic living conditions endangered public health."  These reports were further used "... to order the demolition of several dwellings in Chinatown in 1913."

Darwin's Chinatown was razed to the ground during World War II, through a combination of Japanese bombing, looting and bulldozing. The territory's civilian population had mostly been evacuated during the war and returned to find their homes and businesses reduced to rubble. In 1943, the territory's administrator Aubrey Abbott wrote to Joseph Carrodus, secretary of the Department of the Interior, proposing that the federal government use the absence of the Chinese population to compulsorily acquire Darwin's Chinatown and thereby effect "the elimination of undesirable elements which Darwin has suffered from far too much in the past". He further stated that the acquisition would "entirely prevent the Chinese quarter forming again" and that "if land is acquired from the former Chinese residents there is really no need for them to return as they have no other assets".

There is presently no Chinatown in Darwin. However, there is an office building named "Chinatown" and a car park called the Chinatown Car Park, both on Smith St in the city centre.

References

Further reading

Darwin